Rashad Ahmad Ross (born February 2, 1990) is an American football wide receiver who is currently a free agent. He played college football at Arizona State University, and was signed as an undrafted free agent by the Tennessee Titans following the 2013 NFL Draft.

Early years
Ross attended and played high school football at Vallejo High School.

College career
Ross played college football for Butte College in 2010, and later transferred to Arizona State University to play for the Sun Devils from 2011 to 2012 under head coaches Dennis Erickson and Todd Graham. In the 2011 season, he handled kick return duties and had 18 receptions for 254 receiving yards and one receiving touchdown. The one touchdown was part of a five-reception, 108-yard performance in a 47–38 loss to California. In the 2012 season, his role in the offense expanded and he had 37 receptions for 610 receiving yards and six receiving touchdowns to go along with 100-yard kickoff return touchdown in a 51–17 victory over Colorado. Two of his memorable games in 2012 were a 79-yard, two-touchdown performance in a 46–7 victory over Washington State and a 139-yard, three-touchdown performance in a 62–28 victory over Navy in the 2012 Fight Hunger Bowl.

Collegiate statistics

Professional career

Tennessee Titans
After going unselected in the 2013 NFL Draft, Ross was signed by the Tennessee Titans on April 30, 2013. After being released for final roster cuts, the Titans signed him to their practice squad.

Kansas City Chiefs
On November 12, 2013, Ross was signed to the practice squad of the Kansas City Chiefs. The Chiefs released him on May 12, 2014.

Washington Redskins
Ross signed with the Washington Redskins on May 23, 2014. The Redskins waived Ross on August 26, 2014.

Chicago Bears
Ross signed with the practice squad of the Chicago Bears on September 1, 2014. He was released by the team on September 30.

Washington Redskins (second stint)
Ross was signed to the Washington Redskins' practice squad on October 15, 2014. Ross was released from the practice squad on November 17, 2014, but was re-signed on December 8. He signed a futures contract on December 29.

After working out with fellow wide receiver, DeSean Jackson, during the 2015 offseason, Ross had an outstanding preseason performance. After all four preseason games, Ross recorded 25 receptions for 266 receiving yards and four touchdowns, leading the league in all three categories. After final roster cuts, Ross remained on the active 53-man roster as a reserve receiver.

He became the team's kickoff returner in 2015. Quickly into action against the New York Giants on Thursday Night Football, Ross recorded his first two career receptions, as well as his first touchdown off of a 101-yard kick return. In Week 4 against the Philadelphia Eagles, he had a 43-yard reception in the third quarter. He recovered a punt blocked by safety Jeron Johnson in the endzone against the New York Jets in Week 6, scoring his second career touchdown. In the last game of the regular season against the Dallas Cowboys, Ross recorded a 71-yard touchdown reception from backup quarterback Colt McCoy, the first receiving touchdown of his career.

In the 2016 season, Ross was active for five games recording one catch for 8 yards. He was released by the Redskins on December 22, 2016.

Detroit Lions
On December 24, 2016, Ross was signed to the Detroit Lions' practice squad.

San Francisco 49ers
On January 19, 2017, Ross signed a reserve/future contract with the San Francisco 49ers. He was released on June 1, 2017.

Buffalo Bills
On June 6, 2017, Ross signed with the Buffalo Bills. On August 29, 2017, he was released by the Bills.

Arizona Cardinals
On December 19, 2017, Ross signed with the Arizona Cardinals' practice squad. He signed a reserve/future contract with the Cardinals on January 2, 2018.

On August 14, 2018, Ross was released by the Cardinals.

Arizona Hotshots
In late 2018, Ross signed with the Arizona Hotshots of the Alliance of American Football. In the season opener against the Salt Lake Stallions, he caught 5 receptions for 103 yards and 2 touchdowns. When the AAF was suspended, Ross had 36 receptions for 583 yards and a league-leading seven touchdowns. In addition,  he had AAF’s highest receiving grade from Pro Football Focus.

Carolina Panthers
On April 4, 2019, Ross signed with the Carolina Panthers. He was waived during final roster cuts on August 30, 2019.

Los Angeles Wildcats
In October 2019, Ross was selected by the Los Angeles Wildcats in the 2020 XFL Draft.

DC Defenders
Ross was traded to the DC Defenders in exchange for wide receiver Tre McBride on January 12, 2020. In his XFL debut, Ross recorded two receptions for 52 yards and a touchdown against the Seattle Dragons. During the five games played during the COVID-19 pandemic shortened 2020 season, Ross caught 12 passes for 193 yards and one touchdown. He had his contract terminated when the league suspended operations on April 10, 2020.

Montreal Alouettes
Ross signed with the Montreal Alouettes of the CFL on June 9, 2021 but was released during the season on October 21, 2021.

San Diego Strike Force
On March 24, 2022, Ross signed with the San Diego Strike Force of the Indoor Football League (IFL). On December 8, 2022, Ross was released by the Strike Force.

References

External links

 Arizona State Sun Devils bio

1990 births
Living people
Sportspeople from Vallejo, California
Players of American football from California
Arizona State Sun Devils football players
American football wide receivers
Tennessee Titans players
Kansas City Chiefs players
Washington Redskins players
Chicago Bears players
Detroit Lions players
San Francisco 49ers players
Buffalo Bills players
Arizona Cardinals players
Arizona Hotshots players
Carolina Panthers players
Los Angeles Wildcats (XFL) players
DC Defenders players
Montreal Alouettes players